In 2015, Switzerland had the lowest mortality rate in Europe, at 331 per 100,000 population. It had the highest rate of death from drug use at 3 per 100,000.

Switzerland has an infant mortality rate of about 3.6 out of 1,000. The general life expectancy in 2013 was 80.5 years for men and 84.8 years for women, with an 82.6 year average. These are among the world's best figures. About a third of the population have an immigrant background. Infants of African, Sri Lankan, Turkish nationality, and Europeans from the former Yugoslavia, have higher mortality at birth than Swiss children.

A new measure of expected human capital calculated for 195 countries from 1990 to 2016 and defined for each birth cohort as the expected years lived from age 20 to 64 years and adjusted for educational attainment, learning or education quality, and functional health status was published by The Lancet in September 2018. Switzerland had the twelfth highest level of expected human capital with 25 health, education, and learning-adjusted expected years lived between age 20 and 64 years.

Mental illness

It is estimated that one out of six persons in Switzerland suffers from mental illness. Other studies estimate that between 20 to 30 per cent of the population suffers from clinical psychological disorders. The annual cost for brain disorders is SFr15 billion ($13.7 billion) - more than SFr2,000 per person according to Swiss medical sources (2008).

Switzerland has the highest rate of psychiatrists per population in the OECD (Iceland has half as many psychiatrists as in Switzerland and is ranked second).

Stress

Studies reveal that over 27% of Swiss workers are stressed and nearly 30% of Swiss people say that they are "emotionally exhausted". Health Promotion Switzerland says that job-related stress results in a loss of productivity worth about $6.6 billion per year or 1% of Switzerland’s GDP.

Anxiety
The most common psychiatric illnesses are anxiety disorders with 710,000 cases (2008)

Migraine
Migraine cases as part of “neurological illnesses” stand at 630,000 cases (2008).

Depression
Around 345,000 people saw a doctor about depression in 2008.

Bipolar
As of 2022, about 80,000 people were diagnosed with bipolar disorder.

Schizophrenia
As of 2021, nearly 85,000 people in Switzerland were suffering from schizophrenia.

Sleeping disorders
52% of the Swiss say they have problem sleeping (2022).

Alzheimer

Cancer

Some 23,100 men and 19,650 women were diagnosed with cancer every year between 2013 and 2017, according to a Swiss report; with an increase of 3,350 new cases compared with the previous five-year period (because of an aging population). According to studies, alcohol consumption, smoking and pollution are main factors contributing to cancer.

Addictions

Internet
On average in 2019, 16–25 years olds spend 4 hours on the internet every day. Between 73,000 and 290,000 people in Switzerland had "problematic" time usage of the internet.

Gambling
Nearly 3% of people in Switzerland gamble excessively spending 122 Swiss Francs per month on average. Over 70 thousand persons were banned from Swiss casinos for excessive gambling in 2020.

Illegal drugs

As of 2017, out of a population of 8 million, Swiss people smoke more than half a million joints per day. The Swiss health office estimates there are 220,000 regular consumers of cannabis in Switzerland despite a legal ban.

Drug use is 14% of men and 6.5% of women between 20 and 24 saying they had consumed cannabis in the past 30 days, and 5 Swiss cities were listed among the top 10 European cities for cocaine use as measured in wastewater. Since the early 90's, when drug use was dramatically increasing in urban areas, Switzerland has pioneered effective drug policies of harm reduction, prevention and treatment, including HAT as well as decriminalisation of recreational cannabis use. With the revision of Swiss federal narcotics regulations in 2008, the medical use of cannabis was also legalised.

The number of opioid-related calls made to Tox Info Suisse, the national poisoning hotline, increased by 177% between 2000 and 2019. During the same period, sales of opioids almost doubled, from 14,300 units sold per 100,000 inhabitants to 27,400, with Fentanyl being the third most sold opioid in Switzerland.

Analysis of Swiss police records suggests that participants in medical drug rehabilitation programs tend to reduce cocaine, cannabis and heroin use, and the need to commit other crimes to buy their drugs, such as shoplifting, burglary or car theft.

Legal pills
An estimated 350,000 people in Switzerland are addicted to sleeping pills.

Alcoholism
According to official statistics, the percentage of adults drinking alcohol every day has decreased by 50% over the past 25 years, from 20% to 11%. Overall, 82% of the population regularly drinks alcoholic beverages. In 2016, Swiss hospitals treated 11,500 people for alcohol poisoning; about half of the patients were diagnosed as alcoholics. Among those who seek help to quit drinking, the average age is 46; 70% are male.

Smoking
Between 2008 and 2018, the percentage of smokers has remained stable at around 27%.

Communicable diseases

HIV/AIDS

By the end of 2020, Switzerland had 236 registered HIV new infections (about a third fewer than in 2019, partly because of the COVID-19 pandemic). In 2018, 17,000 people were infected with HIV/AIDS according to official statistics.

Gonorrhea
Switzerland had 4,000 cases of gonorrhea in 2021.

Chlamydia

In 2021, Switzerland had 12,000 cases of chlamydia which is a sexually transmissible disease.

COVID-19

Environmental issues related to health

Chemicals

Lead poisoning

Carcinogens
Asbestos:
Glyphosate:
Dioxin: High levels of dioxin have been detected in Lausanne in 2021.

Air pollution

Nanoparticles

Soil contamination

In Switzerland, there are officially 38,000 polluted sites, 4,000 of which represent a real threat to groundwater.

Radiation
According to official study, 5G is not harmful to health. Critics say the study was not conducted in "realistic" conditions however.

Water and sanitation

Nutrition and obesity

As of 2017, the share of people classified as overweight (body mass index (BMI) 25 to 30) has remained stable at 42% of the population. However, over the last 25 years, the percentage of obese people (BMI>30) has more than doubled, from 5% in 1992 to 11% in 2017.

Junk foods

Bio food

Sugar based

Fatties

Food additives

Food packaging

Sports and fitness

Since 2002 until 2018, the number of people who are physically active has increased from 62% to 76%.

Major causes of death

Between 2013 and 2017, around 9,400 Swiss men and 7,650 women died from cancer every year. This means that around 30% of all male deaths and 23% of all female deaths were due to cancer. Over the past four decades, the number of suicides per 100,000 residents has dropped from 24.9 to 9.5 (2022).

Family planning

See also
Healthcare in Switzerland
 Obesity in Switzerland

References